The 2007 European Fencing Championships was held in Ghent, Belgium. The event took place from 2 to 7 June 2007.

Medal summary

Men's events

Women's events

Medal table

Results

Men

Épée individual

Bracket:

Foil individual

Bracket:

Sabre individual

Bracket:

Épée team

Bracket:

Foil team

Bracket:

Sabre team

Bracket:

Women

Épée individual

Bracket:

Foil individual

Bracket:

Sabre individual

Bracket:

Épée team

Bracket:

Foil team

Bracket:

Sabre team

Bracket:

References

2007
European Fencing Championships
2007 European Fencing Championships
European Fencing Championships
Sports competitions in Ghent
June 2007 sports events in Europe
21st century in Ghent